Redbournbury is a hamlet in the county of Hertfordshire. It is located near the A5 road in between the city of St Albans and the large village of Redbourn. It has a mill called Redbournbury Mill. It has a fishery called Redbournbury Fishery and Sporting Clays.

References

Hamlets in Hertfordshire
River Ver
City of St Albans